The 51st Assembly District of Wisconsin is one of 99 districts in the Wisconsin State Assembly. Located in southwest Wisconsin, the district comprises most of Lafayette County, as well as most of the southern half of Green County, central and western Iowa County, southwest Sauk County, and part of southeast Richland County.  It includes the cities of Darlington, Dodgeville, Mineral Point, Monroe, and Shullsburg, and the villages of Argyle, Avoca, Belmont, Cobb, Gratiot, Highland, Lime Ridge, Lone Rock, Loganville, Plain, Rewey, and Spring Green.  It also contains landmarks such as Frank Lloyd Wright's Taliesin estate, the historic Iowa County Courthouse, Governor Dodge State Park, Yellowstone Lake State Park, and Cadiz Springs State Recreation Area. The district is represented by Republican Todd Novak, since January 2015.

The 51st Assembly district is located within Wisconsin's 17th Senate district, along with the 49th and 50th Assembly districts.

List of past representatives

References 

Wisconsin State Assembly districts
Green County, Wisconsin
Iowa County, Wisconsin
Lafayette County, Wisconsin
Richland County, Wisconsin
Sauk County, Wisconsin